Hedyotis lawsoniae is a species of flowering plant in the coffee family, endemic to Sri Lanka.

Uses
ornamental.

References 

lawsoniae
Endemic flora of Sri Lanka